The calling of the disciples is a key episode in the life of Jesus in the New Testament. It appears in Matthew 4:18–22, Mark 1:16-20 and Luke 5:1–11 on the Sea of Galilee. John 1:35–51 reports the first encounter with two of the disciples a little earlier in the presence of John the Baptist. Particularly in the Gospel of Mark, the beginning of the Ministry of Jesus and the call of the first disciples are inseparable.

Gospel of John
In the Gospel of John the first disciples are also disciples of John the Baptist and one of them is identified as Andrew, the brother of Apostle Peter:

Andrew is called the Protokletos or "first-called".

The gathering of the disciples in  follows the many patterns of discipleship that continue in the New Testament, in that those who have received someone else's witness become witnesses to Jesus themselves. Andrew follows Jesus because of the testimony of John the Baptist, Philip brings Nathanael and the pattern continues in  where the Samaritan woman at the well testifies to the town people about Jesus.

Gospels of Matthew and Peter the baptist 
The Gospel of Matthew and the Gospel of Mark report the call of the first disciples by the Sea of Galilee:

Gospel of Luke

The Gospel of Luke reports the call by the Sea of Galilee too, but along with the first miraculous draught of fishes. In all Gospel accounts, this episode takes place after the Baptism of Jesus.

Commentary
John McEvilly notes that Jesus choose His followers and representatives from among "the foolish, base, and contemptible things of this world," in order to show that the success of the Gospel was completely "the work of God, and not of man." He believes that while "walking," (Matt. 4:18) Jesus was meditating on the way he might establish and consolidate the kingdom of heaven.

Cornelius a Lapide comments on the phrase, “From now on you will catch men,” (Luke 5:10) noting that the Greek ζωγρῶν means "take them alive, catch them for life." St. Ambrose translates this verse with "make them live," as if Christ had said, “Fishermen take fishes for death, that they may kill them, but thou, O Peter, shalt catch men unto life, that they may begin a new life, and live unto God in holiness.”

See also
 Chronology of Jesus
 Gospel harmony
 Calling of Matthew
 Commissioning the twelve Apostles
 Life of Jesus in the New Testament

References

Gospel episodes
Twelve Apostles
Sea of Galilee